Club de Fútbol Gallos Hidrocálidos de Aguascalientes was a football club from Aguascalientes, Mexico.

History
The club was founded in 1994, when Jose Carmelo Gonzalez, bought a second division franchise which he relocated to Aguascalientes where there was no professional football club.

The club played its last tournament in 2000-2001 when the Governor of Aguascalientes bought first division club Necaxa, with its national following, and relocated it from Mexico City. Gallos de Aguascalientes was then sold to Chivas, which changed its name to F.C. Tapatio de Guadalajara, affiliated to Chivas.

In 2012 the team was refounded to participate in the Third Division, in 2014 it stopped participating in the league, however, between 2015 and 2019 its registration was used by the clubs Tamasopo F.C., Lobos de Zacoalco and Autlán F.C.

Honors
Primera Division "A": 1
2000

Segunda División de México: 1
1998

References

See also
Segunda División Profesional
Primera "A"
Necaxa
Football in Mexico

Association football clubs established in 1994
1994 establishments in Mexico
Ascenso MX teams